Shatabhisha, also known as Chathayam or Sadayam (Devanagari: शतभिषा), or Shatabhishak or Shatataraka is the 24th nakshatra in Hindu astronomy. It corresponds to the star γ Aquarii.  Varuna is the deity of this nakshatra. The ruling planet of this nakshatra is Rahu.

Nakshatra